Nigerian Upstream Petroleum Regulatory Commission, formerly the Department of Petroleum Resources (DPR), is a department under the Nigerian Federal Ministry of Petroleum Resources (FMPR). It monitors the oil and gas industry to ensure compliance with relevant regulations and laws. It also oversees the safety and other regulations that relate to the exportation and importation of the products into the country. As part of its activities, the department manages the upstream and downstream sectors in Nigeria petroleum industry. The Federal Government of Nigeria introduces National Production Monitoring Systems (NIPMS) to monitor the royalty payables and demand notices from all organizations dealing in petroleum in Nigeria.

Overview
DPR started as Hydrocarbon section under the Ministry of Lagos Affairs, with direct supervision from the Governor-General. In 1970, the name DPR was carved out due to the expansion of activities in the ministry. By the beginning of 1971 the FGN created Nigerian National Oil Corporation (NNOC), to manage commercial operational activities in the petroleum industry. The department became the MPR in 1975. In 1977, the Nigerian National Petroleum Corporation (NNPC) was formed by the decree 33 of 1977 through the merger of MPR and NNOC. It also, led to the creation of Petroleum Inspectorate , the industry regulator. In 1985, the MPR was carved out of NNOC while NNPC remains. In the same year, the PI was moved back to the MPR.

The Petroleum Industry Act (PIA) signed by President Muhammadu Buhari in 2021 established the Nigerian Upstream Petroleum Regulatory Commission (NUPRC) replacing the Department of Petroleum Resource (DPR).

References

External links 

 

Oil and gas companies of Nigeria
Nigeria
Energy companies established in 1970
Non-renewable resource companies established in 1970
1970 establishments in Nigeria